Dr Elizabeth Wood-Ellem  (10 September 1930 – 8 September 2012) was a Tongan-born Australian historian actively engaged in the life of Tonga and author of the definitive biography of Queen Sālote Tupou III of Tonga.

Birth and family

Born Elizabeth Olive Wood near Nuku'alofa, Tonga, she was often known as Bess or Pesi Wood.  She was a daughter of Reverend Dr A. Harold Wood OBE (1896–1989), a renowned Methodist then Uniting Church minister and educator, and medical Dr Olive K. Wood (née O'Reilly), who were Australian missionaries in Tonga from 1924 to 1937. She had five brothers and sisters, including Janet Secomb, herself a missionary to Tonga, actor Monica Maughan and Uniting Church minister and hymnologist Rev. Dr H. D'Arcy Wood.

Education

Moving to Australia in 1937, Elizabeth was educated at Methodist Ladies' College in Melbourne where, in her final year, she topped the state of Victoria in Greek and Roman History.

At Melbourne University, she majored in English and History, gaining a BA in 1953, and would later undertake her PhD there.

Career
Wood-Ellem earned her living as a book editor and indexer, initially at Angus & Robertson in Sydney, then London (1960–72) with Macmillan and Paul Hamlyn, and later worked freelance.

She was appointed an archivist at King's College, Cambridge University, to sort and catalogue the papers of British novelist E. M. Forster after his death in 1970.  Churchill College, Cambridge then engaged her as Assistant Librarian for Archives to catalogue Sir James Grigg's papers and A.V. Alexander's correspondence.

She completed a PhD in Tongan history in 1982 at the University of Melbourne and remained a Senior Fellow there at the time of her death. She published her biography of Queen Sālote of Tonga in 1999.  Fairfax’s Pacific correspondent Mike Field said of it:

‘If I were nominate a single, superb book on the Pacific, Queen Sālote of Tonga: The Story of an Era 1900-1965 is one of the finest pieces of historical research and insight, anthropology and understanding of Tonga that you’ll ever find.  You don’t even have to be vaguely interested in Queen Sālote, but in how Tonga works.’

Notable books she edited include The Songs and Poems of Queen Sālote (2004) and Tonga and the Tongans: Heritage and Identity (2007).

In 2008, King George Tupou V recognised her singular contribution to Tonga by bestowing on her the title of Commander of the Order of the Crown of Tonga.

Publications

Notable books she edited include:
The Songs and Poems of Queen Sālote (2004)
Tonga and the Tongans: Heritage and Identity (2007)

Honours
National honours
  Order of the Crown of Tonga, Commander (31 July 2008).

References

University of Melbourne alumni
Uniting Church in Australia people
1930 births
2012 deaths

Commanders of the Order of the Crown of Tonga
Australian women historians
20th-century Australian historians
Academic staff of the University of Melbourne
Australian expatriates in Tonga
Tongan historians
Historians of Oceania
Tongan women writers
20th-century Tongan writers
21st-century Tongan writers
20th-century Australian non-fiction writers
21st-century Australian non-fiction writers
20th-century Australian women writers
21st-century Australian women writers
20th-century Tongan women
21st-century Tongan women